Michael Smith Jr. (born October 16, 1962) is an American former professional tennis player.

Smith grew up in Little Rock and attended Duke University, where he played varsity tennis while studying for an economics degree. After graduating in 1985 he competed in professional tennis, with his best performances coming in doubles. He had a highest doubles ranking of 209 and featured in the 1987 Australian Open men's doubles main draw.

ATP Challenger finals

Doubles: 1 (0–1)

References

External links
 
 

1962 births
Living people
American male tennis players
Duke Blue Devils men's tennis players
Tennis people from Arkansas
Sportspeople from Little Rock, Arkansas